Run Vibes was a music television show that aired from 2005 to 2009 on Télé Réunion on Réunion Island.

Hosted by Rodee Cox, the show featured the Music of Réunion, including Hip Hop, Reggae, Dancehall, breakdance and traditional music from Réunion (so sega and maloya). It has led to participation of national and international artists.

Many artists have made appearances on the set of Run Vibes, before being known in international circles.

Run Vibes also featured interviews with craft workers, painters, actors in the world of theater and the hosts of the program are also Sidewalks Entertainment. The program also featured graffiti art from the Alez Crew.

See also
Music of Réunion

References

External links
 Article by RFO Réunion son Run Vibes.  

France Télévisions original programming
Music of Réunion
French music television series
Mass media in Réunion